Borre is a commune in the Nord department in northern France.

History

The Borre British Cemetery is located in this village, in route de Sec-Bois. It contains 370 graves from the First World War, of which 129 are British, 238 Australian and 3 German.

In 1940, one of the first German planes damaged in the north of France crashed in Borre. The whole population came out to see the aircraft. Despite the warnings of the crew, who had been captured and locked in the town hall, dozens were killed when the bombs exploded.

Population

Heraldry

See also
Communes of the Nord department

References

Communes of Nord (French department)
Nord communes articles needing translation from French Wikipedia
French Flanders